North Camp railway station is situated in the civil parish of Ash in Surrey, England.  It takes its name from the nearby North Camp area of Farnborough, Hampshire.

The station is managed by Great Western Railway, who provide services on the North Downs Line from Reading to Guildford, Redhill and Gatwick Airport.  It is staffed on a part-time basis (mornings/early afternoons, Mon-Sat) and has a level crossing at the Reading end.

Ash Vale
The station is less than half a mile (one kilometre)'s walk from Ash Vale station (on the Ascot to Guildford line).  These railway lines cross but otherwise have no proper interchange.  This is because they were constructed by two independent railway companies who did not think it necessary to provide an interchange.

History
The station opened in 1858 as North Camp, Aldershot. It was renamed Aldershot Camp in 1863, Aldershot (North Camp) in 1879, Aldershot (North Camp) & South Farnborough in June 1910, Aldershot North in July 1923 before receiving its present name in March 1924.

Services 
Great Western Railway provide two services per hour between Reading and Redhill, one stopping service and one semi-fast. On Sundays there is an hourly service each way between Reading and Gatwick Airport. As of 1 January 2018, a 1/2 Hourly Sunday service interval was introduced between Reading and Redhill, with one train per hour going forward to Gatwick Airport

Gallery

References

External links 

Railway stations in Surrey
DfT Category E stations
Former South Eastern Railway (UK) stations
Railway stations in Great Britain opened in 1858
Railway stations served by Great Western Railway
Farnborough, Hampshire